Napierville is a municipality in the  Jardins de Napierville Regional County Municipality in Quebec, Canada, situated in the Montérégie administrative region. The population as of the 2021 Canadian Census was 4,020. It is the location of the seat of the Jardins de Napierville Regional County Municipality. It is surrounded by the municipality of Saint-Cyprien-de-Napierville.

Demographics

Population

Language

See also
List of municipalities in Quebec

References

External links
Napierville official website

Municipalities in Quebec
Incorporated places in Les Jardins-de-Napierville Regional County Municipality